There are several schools in the United States called Chapel Hill High School:

Chapel Hill High School (Chapel Hill, North Carolina)
Chapel Hill High School (Douglasville, Georgia)
Chapel Hill High School (Tyler, Texas)
East Chapel Hill High School (Chapel Hill, North Carolina)